David Walker (1884–1935) was an English footballer who played in the Football League for Leicester Fosse, West Bromwich Albion and Wolverhampton Wanderers.

References

1884 births
1935 deaths
English footballers
Association football forwards
English Football League players
Wolverhampton Wanderers F.C. players
Bristol Rovers F.C. players
West Bromwich Albion F.C. players
Leicester City F.C. players
Willenhall F.C. players
Walsall F.C. players